Lieutenant-Colonel James Henry Reynolds VC (3 February 1844 – 4 March 1932), born Kingstown (Dún Laoghaire), County Dublin, was an Irish recipient of the Victoria Cross for his actions at the Battle of Rorke's Drift, the highest and most prestigious award for gallantry in the face of the enemy that can be awarded to British and Commonwealth forces. He was educated at Castleknock College and Trinity College, Dublin.

Details

Reynolds was 34 years old, and a Surgeon in the Army Medical Department (later Royal Army Medical Corps), British Army during the Zulu War when the following deed took place on 22/23 January 1879, at Rorke's Drift, Natal, South Africa, for which he was awarded the VC:

Surgeon Reynolds also had by his side the whole time during the battle his fox terrier named Dick. Dick never wavered as shots and spears continued falling around them. He only left his side once to bite a Zulu who came too close. Dick was specially mentioned in the citation for "his constant attention to the wounded under the fire where they fell."

For his conduct in the battle, Reynolds was also promoted to Surgeon-Major (promotion dated 23 January 1879).

The battle was the subject of the 1964 film Zulu, with Reynolds portrayed by the actor Patrick Magee.

His account of the battle

The medal
His Victoria Cross is displayed at the Museum of Military Medicine (Aldershot, England).

References

Listed in order of publication year 
The Register of the Victoria Cross (1981, 1988 and 1997)

Ireland's VCs  (Dept of Economic Development, 1995)
Monuments to Courage (David Harvey, 1999)
Irish Winners of the Victoria Cross (Richard Doherty & David Truesdale, 2000)

External links
James Henry Reynolds (biography, photos, memorial details)
Location of grave and VC medal (W. London)
Surgeon-Major J.H. Reynolds 
Rorke's Drift (information within Frederick Hitch site)

1844 births
1932 deaths
19th-century Irish people
Alumni of Trinity College Dublin
Anglo-Zulu War recipients of the Victoria Cross
British Army personnel of the Anglo-Zulu War
British Army recipients of the Victoria Cross
Burials at St Mary's Catholic Cemetery, Kensal Green
Catholic Unionists
Irish expatriates in the United Kingdom
Irish officers in the British Army
Irish recipients of the Victoria Cross
People educated at Castleknock College
People from Dún Laoghaire
Royal Army Medical Corps officers